New Cut Lane Halt was a railway station between Shirdley Hill and Halsall in Lancashire. The station opened in July 1906 as a halt on the Liverpool, Southport and Preston Junction Railway, and consisted of simple cinder based platforms at track level. It was situated to the south of the roadbridge on New Cut Lane, to which it was connected by wooden steps. The station closed to passengers on 26 September 1938 and the tracks were lifted shortly after the line closed in 1952.

References

Sources

External links 
 New Cut Lane Halt via Disused Stations
 The line and mileages via Railwaycodes

Disused railway stations in the Borough of West Lancashire
Former Lancashire and Yorkshire Railway stations
Railway stations in Great Britain opened in 1906
Railway stations in Great Britain closed in 1938
Halsall